William A. Griswold (September 15, 1775 – January 17, 1846) was an American lawyer and politician in the U.S. state of Vermont. He served as the 22nd and 24th Speaker of the Vermont House of Representatives.

Early life
Griswold was born in New Marlborough, Massachusetts on September 15, 1775. His family moved to Bennington, Vermont when he was ten years old and he attended the common schools there. He graduated from Dartmouth College in 1794, studied law and started a law practice in Danville.  Among the prospective attorneys who studied law in his Danville office was Ephraim Paddock.

Political career
In 1803 Griswold was named State's Attorney for Caledonia County, a position in which he served almost continuously until moving to Burlington in 1821. A Democratic-Republican, Griswold represented Danville in the Vermont House of Representatives from 1807–1811.

In 1812 Griswold was one of Vermont's presidential electors, casting his ballot for James Madison. In 1813 Griswold returned to the Vermont House, serving until 1818.  He served again in the State House from 1819–1820. Griswold was Speaker of the House from 1815-1818 and 1819–1820.

He was named United States Attorney for Vermont in 1821, a position in which he served until 1829. In 1828 he was elected to the Vermont Council of Censors. From 1828 until his death he served as President of the Lake Champlain Transportation Company, which operated steamships on Lake Champlain.

Griswold served on the Vermont Governor's Council from 1833–1834. In 1836 Griswold, by now a Whig, was a presidential elector from Vermont and cast his ballot for William Henry Harrison. Griswold represented Burlington in the Vermont House from 1841–1842.

He died in Burlington on January 17, 1846.  He was buried at Elmwood Cemetery in Burlington.

References

	

1775 births
1846 deaths
People from Berkshire County, Massachusetts
People from Caledonia County, Vermont
Politicians from Burlington, Vermont
Dartmouth College alumni
Vermont lawyers
State's attorneys in Vermont
Vermont Democratic-Republicans
Vermont Whigs
19th-century American politicians
United States Attorneys for the District of Vermont
Members of the Vermont House of Representatives
Speakers of the Vermont House of Representatives
Burials in Vermont
19th-century American lawyers